The 1950–51 Plunket Shield season was a tournament of the Plunket Shield, the domestic first-class cricket competition of New Zealand. It was the first season featuring the Central Districts team.

Otago won the championship, finishing at the top of the points table at the end of the round-robin tournament between the five first-class sides, Auckland, Canterbury, Central Districts, Otago and Wellington. Eight points were awarded for a win, four points for having a first innings lead in a draw and two points for a first innings deficit in a draw.

Table
Below are the Plunket Shield standings for the season:

References

Plunket Shield
Plunket Shield